The meteorological history of Hurricane Jeanne lasted for about two weeks in September 2004. Hurricane Jeanne was the eleventh tropical cyclone, tenth named storm, seventh hurricane, and sixth major hurricane  of the 2004 Atlantic hurricane season. It formed from a tropical wave on September 13 near the Lesser Antilles, and encountered favorable enough conditions to reach tropical storm status. Jeanne strengthened further in the eastern Caribbean, becoming a strong tropical storm and developing an eye before striking Puerto Rico on September 15. Remaining well-organized, it attained hurricane status before hitting the eastern tip of the Dominican Republic on September 16.

Hurricane Jeanne steadily weakened while crossing eastern Hispaniola, and on September 17 it briefly weakened to tropical depression status after reaching open waters. Its original circulation dissipated as a new one reformed closer to the main area of thunderstorms. Turning northward, Jeanne slowly reorganized and again reached hurricane status on September 20. It executed a clockwise loop to the west, weakening due to upwelling upon reaching its path again. Jeanne encountered favorable conditions as it continued westward, and it reached major hurricane status before crossing the northern Bahamas on September 25. The next day, it struck Martin County, Florida in nearly the same location as Hurricane Frances just weeks before. Jeanne weakened over land while turning the northwest, deteriorating to tropical depression status over Georgia on September 27. It turned northeastward, becoming extratropical on September 28 before dissipating on September 29 after merging with a cold front.

The hurricane produced heavy rainfall across its path, including in Haiti where precipitation caused devastating mudslides; over 3,000 deaths were reported in the country. Heavy rainfall also occurred during its landfalls on Puerto Rico and Florida, resulting in river flooding. In its strongest landfall, the hurricane produced strong winds across an area earlier affected by Hurricane Frances and, in some locations, by Hurricane Charley. Late in its duration, the combination of moisture from Jeanne and cool air resulted in a tornado outbreak that extended from Georgia through the Mid-Atlantic states.

Formation and first landfall 
The origins of Hurricane Jeanne were from a tropical wave that moved off the coast of Africa on September 7. The system initially showed no signs of development, with unfavorably dry air persisting across the region. On September 11, convection became slightly better organized, and the next day broad cyclonic turning became evident. However, overall development was hindered by upper-level wind shear from Hurricane Ivan in the Caribbean, as well as from an upper-level low to the north of the wave.

Late on September 12, while approaching the northern Lesser Antilles, convection increased and became better organized around an area of increased cyclonic turning. Environmental conditions became more favorable, allowing for the development of a low-pressure area and for banding features to increase.

Upon first becoming a tropical cyclone, the depression was located to the south of the subtropical ridge, resulting in a west-northwest track which brought the center over Guadeloupe. The circulation was initially broad, and dry air temporarily entrained the northwest quadrant of the storm. However, environmental conditions were favorable enough for further development, with a deepening trough to its west providing beneficial flow. While crossing the Lesser Antilles, the storm brought locally heavy rainfall, with a total of  reported in Guadeloupe.

Tropical Storm Jeanne quickly organized over the eastern Caribbean Sea, developing a tight inner core and well-defined outflow as it tracked over warm water temperatures of about 84 °F (29 °C). Initially, the storm was forecast to attain hurricane status before crossing Puerto Rico. However, its organization deteriorated by early on September 15, with radar imagery tracking a low-level circulation moving away from the convection. The temporary weakening was due to increased shear and dry air. Rainfall across the region resulted in moderate to severe river flooding, with several river stations in Puerto Rico reporting historical levels. Light winds, generally around tropical storm force, affected the region as well.

Second landfall and reorganization 

Tropical Storm Jeanne remained over Puerto Rico for about eight hours, during which it maintained its eye feature and well-defined inner core of convection. It intensified over the Mona Passage, and attained hurricane status as it struck the eastern tip of the Dominican Republic on September 16. Continuing slowly west-northwestward near the coast, Jeanne quickly weakened to tropical storm status, and by 24 hours after landfall its convection had deteriorated as the eye feature dissipated. Late on September 17, it emerged into the Atlantic Ocean as a tropical depression, after having dropped torrential rainfall across Hispaniola. Catastrophic flooding and mudslides were experienced in Haiti, including in the coastal city of Gonaïves, and over 3,000 deaths were reported in the country.

On September 17, while it was over Hispaniola, the National Hurricane Center issued a forecast that predicted Jeanne to make landfall near Savannah, Georgia in about five days. However, the forecast noted uncertainty in regards to the steering currents, which depended on the movement of the remnants of Hurricane Ivan and a ridge building behind it. After it left the nation as a tropical depression, the original center of circulation tracked westward away from the convection and dissipated. However, a new circulation developed closer to the convection, and Jeanne regained tropical storm status on September 18. By then, the mid-level circulation associated with Hurricane Ivan had combined with a trough to weaken the ridge located across the western Atlantic Ocean; this caused Jeanne to track northward through the Turks and Caicos Islands.

As it tracked northward, the storm failed to organize at first, due to the influence of an upper-level low to its south. The circulation became broad and elongated, as well as removed from the deepest convection. However, after moving away from the low, the convection became better organized and more associated with the convection. After some initial slow organization continued, an area of deep convection developed over the center midday on September 20.

While intensifying as a tropical storm, the National Hurricane Center faced difficulties in the future track of Jeanne, based on two major divergences between computer hurricane models. One scenario involved the storm accelerating east-northeastward to the south of a trough, following the path of Hurricane Karl to its east. The other scenario involved Jeanne turning southeastward and looping westward due to a building ridge. By early on September 20, the official forecast followed the first scenario, though later that day, officials changed the forecast to indicate the turn to the south.

Peak intensity and final landfall 

At the same time, the National Hurricane Center forecast to turn westward and later northwestward, with its projected five-day track within  of Cape Fear, North Carolina. The westernmost outlier during one model run was the NOGAPS model, which predicted a continued westward motion across central Florida. The official forecast changed early on September 23 to bring Jeanne across northeastern Florida, though initially the cyclone was predicted to turn northeastward and hit South Carolina as a hurricane.

By September 23, Jeanne had begun a slow westward motion, with its previously well-defined eye becoming ragged. It moved slowly over waters it traversed just four days prior, causing upwelling; this is the process in which a stationary storm causes the water temperatures to decrease by bringing the cooler, deeper waters to the surface. As a result, Jeanne weakened to a minimal hurricane midday on September 23, though it was forecast to re-intensify and attain major hurricane status. However, as Jeanne moved toward an area of warmer waters, deep convection redeveloped around the eye. Its favorable upper-level environment allowed the outflow to become better defined, with a large eye and nearby dry air being the primary restraining factors for development. At 1200 UTC on September 25, Jeanne attained major hurricane status, and two hours later it made landfall on Abaco Island.

After it had been previously forecast to turn northwestward and track along the northeastern Florida coast, the forecast shifted 24 hours prior to moving ashore to a landfall point in the east-central portion of the state; the change was due to the persistence of the ridge to its north. As it approached the Florida coastline it did not strengthen much further, due to an eyewall replacement cycle; this is the process in which an outer eyewall forms, causing the original eye to shrink and dissipate due to lack of moisture. The hurricane moved ashore in almost the same location as Hurricane Frances, which made landfall 21 days prior.

In New Smyrna Beach, the storm tide washed away much of the beach to the east of the city seawall. Overall impact from the storm tide was less than expected, due to the storm hitting at low tide. The rainfall caused freshwater flooding, as well as increased levels along the St. Johns River. The hurricane also produced several eyewall mesovortices and tornadoes near where it moved ashore.

Dissipation 

As Hurricane Jeanne moved inland, its inner eyewall dissipated, and its outer eyewall quickly became less distinct. It turned west-northwestward over the state, curving around the western periphery of the ridge to its northeast. By 14 hours after landfall, Jeanne weakened to tropical storm status near the Tampa Bay area. Despite initial forecasts that it would emerge into the Gulf of Mexico, the storm remained over land and continued to slowly weaken. Early on September 27, dry air became entrained into the southern periphery of the circulation, which diminished the thunderstorms to the south. After turning northward, Jeanne entered southern Georgia and weakened into a tropical depression.

A cold front across the region caused the depression to accelerate northeastward, combining moisture from the Gulf of Mexico with cool and stable air over the Carolinas. This combination produced severe thunderstorms across the region, spawning six tornadoes in Georgia, eight in South Carolina, and eight in North Carolina.

After crossing into Virginia, Jeanne transitioned into an extratropical cyclone by September 29 near Washington, D.C. In Wilmington, Delaware, the storm spawned an F2 tornado. Across the Mid-Atlantic and New England, moisture from the storm produced light to heavy rainfall, with totals of over  near Philadelphia and Nantucket. Subsequent to becoming extratropical, the remnants of Jeanne turned eastward, exited into the Atlantic Ocean, and merged with a cold front.

See also 

 Hurricane Jeanne
 Meteorological history of Hurricane Ivan
 2004 Atlantic hurricane season

References 

Jeanne Met
Jeanne (2004)
Jeanne